Santa Fe Depot, Santa Fe Passenger Depot, or variations may refer to many train stations in the United States once operated by the Atchison, Topeka & Santa Fe Railway, including:

Arizona 
 Santa Fe Depot (Wickenburg, Arizona)

California 
 Santa Fe Passenger Depot (Fresno, California)
 La Grande Station (passenger depot), Los Angeles
 Santa Fe Freight Depot, Los Angeles
 Santa Fe Depot (Monrovia, California) 
 Orange Cove Santa Fe Railway Depot
 Del Mar (Los Angeles Metro station), Pasadena
 Santa Fe Depot (Riverside, California)
 Santa Fe Depot (San Bernardino, California)
 Santa Fe Depot (San Diego)
 Santa Fe Passenger and Freight Depot, Shafter

Colorado 
 Atchison, Topeka and Santa Fe Passenger Depot (Colorado Springs, Colorado)
 Santa Fe Depot (Lamar, Colorado)

Illinois 
 Coal City station
 Streator station
 Santa Fe Railway Depot (Galesburg, Illinois)

Iowa 
 Fort Madison station (disambiguation)

Kansas 
 Santa Fe Depot Rail Museum, a former depot in Atchison
 Santa Fe Depot (Baldwin City, Kansas), listed on the National Register of Historic Places (NRHP) in Douglas County
 Santa Fe Railroad Depot, within the Bartlett Arboretum historic area in Belle Plaine
 Atchison, Topeka and Santa Fe Railway Depot (Dodge City, Kansas), listed on the NRHP in Ford County
 Santa Fe Depot (Garden City, Kansas)
 Santa Fe Depot (Newton, Kansas)
 Old Depot Museum, a former Santa Fe depot in Ottawa

Missouri
 Walt Disney Hometown Museum, a former Santa Fe depot in Marceline

New Mexico 
 Santa Fe Depot (Santa Fe, New Mexico)

Oklahoma 
 A former Santa Fe station in Cheyenne, Oklahoma
 Santa Fe Depot (Drumwright, Oklahoma), listed on the NRHP in Creek County
 Railroad Museum of Oklahoma, a former Santa Fe depot in Enid
 Old Santa Fe Depot of Guthrie
 Santa Fe Depot (Marietta, Oklahoma), listed on the NRHP in Love County
 Santa Fe Depot (Norman, Oklahoma), listed on the NRHP in Cleveland County
 Oklahoma City (Amtrak station)
 A former Santa Fe station at Pauls Valley station, Pauls Valley
 A former Santa Fe station in Perry, Oklahoma
 Santa Fe Depot (Ponca City, Oklahoma), listed on the NRHP in Kay County
 Santa Fe Depot (Shawnee, Oklahoma), listed on the NRHP in Pottawatomie County

Texas 
 Santa Fe Passenger Depot at Gainesville
 Santa Fe Passenger Depot (San Angelo, Texas), listed on the NRHP in Tom Green County

See also
Atchison, Topeka and Santa Fe Railway Depot (disambiguation)

de:Santa Fe Depot